4-Chlorobenzonitrile is an organic compound with the formula ClC6H4CN.  It is a white solid.  The compound, one of three isomers of chlorobenzonitrile, is produced industrially by ammoxidation of 4-chlorotoluene. The compound is of commercial interest as a precursor to pigments.

References

Benzonitriles
Chlorobenzenes